Acilisene in Greek and Latin works, also known as Hachdeanq, was a region and family in Armenia c. 400–800. It was a strip of land along the Upper Euphrates or Arsanias (Armenian: Արածանի) roughly corresponding to today's Erzincan Province of Turkey. Its main cities were Երզնկա (Erznka, today's Erzincan, Turkey) also known in Byzantine sources as Celtzene and Անի-Կամախ (Ani-Kamax, today's Kemah, Turkey) nearby the ancient necropolis of the Arsacid kings of Armenia. The Erznka valley, crossed by the Upper Euphrates was the location of the most important pre-Christian shrine in Armenia, dedicated to the Armenian goddess Anahit. The temple, whose site has not yet been identified, was in a settlement called Erez.

See also
List of regions of old Armenia

Early medieval Armenian regions